The Brede-class lifeboat was operated by the Royal National Lifeboat Institution (RNLI) from its stations around the coasts of the United Kingdom between 1982 and 2002, at which time it was the fastest all-weather lifeboat in its fleet. Eleven were put into service and when replaced by larger boats seven were sold for further use as lifeboats, mainly in South Africa.

The class took its name from the River Brede which joins the River Rother to flow into the English Channel at Rye, Sussex.

History
During the 1960s and 1970s the RNLI had placed a number of fast lifeboats into service. These had mostly been  Waveney-class lifeboats but there was a need for smaller, more manoeuvrable boats that were larger than the  inshore lifeboats. A large boat was built using the construction methods of the Atlantic 21 but this Medina-class lifeboat was never adopted. A prototype Brede was constructed in 1981 and the following year the first two production Brede-class were built. Ten more production boats followed but production ceased in 1985. The first Brede to be withdrawn was RNLB Ann Richie (ON 1080) which only saw five years service. The boats had been too small to operate in extreme weather and surveys highlighted potential problems with structural strength.

Most of the fleet found new use with other rescue services. One was transported to New Zealand in 1993, and six were sold between 1994 and 2002 for use in South Africa. The NSRI in South Africa announced in September 2016 that they were embarking on a project to replace their ageing Brede lifeboat fleet, starting with Eikos Rescuer II (RNLI 1104) based in Durban, with further replacements planned for every two years. The Brede lifeboats will be sold out of the fleet as they are replaced.

Description
The Brede was built with a glass reinforced plastic (GRP) hull, a strengthened version of a commercial design by Lochin Marine of Rye, Sussex.

The hull was divided into five watertight compartments and spaces were filled with buoyant materials which combined with a watertight GRP wheelhouse to give it a self-righting capability. A survivors' cabin was sited forward of the wheelhouse with eight seats and a stretcher could be carried in the wheelhouse which had seats for the four crew members.

RNLI fleet
All built by Lochin Marine, Rye

Other fleets

New Zealand

South Africa
Second-hand Bredes operated by the National Sea Rescue Institute in South Africa. As from 2019, the NSRI has embarked on a project to replace the ageing Brede fleet with a new class of lifeboat.

References

External links
  The Royal National Lifeboat Institution
  National Sea Rescue Institute of South Africa

Royal National Lifeboat Institution lifeboats